Monie Tung (born 26 November 1980) is a Hong Kong film and television entertainer, programme host and stage actress.

Early life
Tung started in the industry when she was 6 years old, appearing in the children's television show 430 Space Shuttle. She attended the Sheng Kung Hui Lam Woo Memorial Secondary School, and later graduated from the University of Hong Kong College of Arts (majoring in French literature).

Career
In 2004 she began her entertainment career. Beginning as a singer, she released her debut album Monie Monie. She later became a film and television actress starring in many films of which her most significant works are My Mother Is a Belly Dancer and Whispers and Moans.

From 2013 onwards she hosted the entertainment programme Entertainment Flagship Store for the Metro Info, until the last episode on 8 January 2016.

Personal life 
Tung's husband is Zhuang Yaojin, a lawyer.

Discography

Album

Singles

Send songs

Filmography

Films

Television dramas

Microfilms

Advertising

Before entering the line

After entering the line

Stage shows

Participating programmes

Television series

Metro Broadcast Corporation

RTHK Teen Power

Hong Kong and Taiwan TV

Asian TV

Hong Kong Cable TV

ViuTV

Programmes that participated as a guest

Music videos

As a concert guest/performer

References

External links
Headlines daily, 11 September 2011 
 

1980 births
Living people
Hong Kong film actresses
Hong Kong television actresses
21st-century Hong Kong women singers
Alumni of the University of Hong Kong